Kennedy Fraser (born 1948) is an American essayist, and fashion writer.

Life
She is a native of England.
Her work appeared in Vogue, The New Yorker, where she wrote for William Shawn.

Awards
 1994 Whiting Award

Works

Books

Anthologies

Articles
"The Mighty Penn", Vogue, July 2007.

References

External links
Profile at The Whiting Foundation
"The Dressers", New York Magazine

1948 births
Living people
English essayists
British fashion journalists
American essayists